Nationality words link to articles with information on the nation's poetry or literature (for instance, Irish or France).

Events
April 10 – Percy Bysshe Shelley matriculates at University College, Oxford. In September, he publishes through J. J. Stockdale in London Original Poetry by Victor and Cazire co-written with his sister Elizabeth before he came up to Oxford, but withdrawn due to plagiarism of one poem; and in November he and his friend Thomas Jefferson Hogg publish the burlesque Posthumous Fragments of Margaret Nicholson; Being Poems found amongst the Papers of that Noted Female who attempted the Life of the King in 1786 "Edited by John Fitzvictor" in Oxford. Two Gothic novellas by him are also published anonymously this year in London.

Works published

United Kingdom
 Lucy Aikin, Epistles on Women
 Sir Alexander Boswell, writing under the pen name "Simon Gray", Edinburgh; or, The Ancient Royalty 
 Lord Byron, "The Maid of Athens"
 George Crabbe, The Borough in 24 epistles, including one on "Peter Grimes", a poem based on Aldeburgh
 Ebenezer Elliott, Night
 Mary Elliott, The Mice and the Pic Nic, published anonymously "by a Looking-glass Maker"; for children
 Gammer Gurton, Garland or the Nursery Parnassus, including "Little Bo-peep has lost her sheep"
 Charles Lamb and Mary Lamb, writing together under the pen name "W. F. Mylius", The First Book of Poetry, has 22 items from Poetry for Children (1809), and selections from other authors and a new poem, "A Birth-Day Thought"; 10 editions by 1828, anthology
 Mary Russell Mitford, Poems
 Samuel Rogers, The Voyage of Columbus
 Walter Scott:
 Editor, English Minstrelsy
 The Lady of the Lake
 Poetical Works
 Anna Seward, Poetical Works, edited by Walter Scott
 P. B. Shelley and Elizabeth Shelley (his sister), Original Poetry by Victor and Cazire, published anonymously
 P. B. Shelley and Thomas Jefferson Hogg, Posthumous Fragments of Margaret Nicholson, published anonymously
 William Sotheby, Constance of Castille
 Robert Southey, The Curse of Kehama
 Ann Taylor, Jane Taylor and others, Hymns for Infant Minds

Other
 William Crafts, The Raciad and Other Occasional Poems, United States
 Theodor Körner, Knospen ("Buds"), Germany

Births
Death years link to the corresponding "[year] in poetry" article:
 May 23 – Margaret Fuller (drowned 1850), American journalist, critic, editor, poet and women's rights activist associated with the American Transcendentalism movement
 June 7 – Friedrich Julius Hammer (died 1862), German poet
 July 17 – Martin Farquhar Tupper (died 1889), English writer, and poet,
 December 11 – Alfred de Musset (died 1857), French dramatist, poet, and novelist

Deaths
Death years link to the corresponding "[year] in poetry" article:
 May 17 – Robert Tannahill (born 1774), Scottish poet known as the "Weaver Poet"
 John Finlay (born 1782), Scottish poet
 Twm o'r Nant, also known as Thomas Edwards, (born 1739), Welsh language dramatist and poet

See also

 Poetry
 List of years in poetry
 List of years in literature
 19th century in literature
 19th century in poetry
 Romantic poetry
 Golden Age of Russian Poetry (1800–1850)
 Weimar Classicism period in Germany, commonly considered to have begun in 1788  and to have ended either in 1805, with the death of Friedrich Schiller, or 1832, with the death of Goethe
 List of poets

Notes

 "A Timeline of English Poetry" Web page of the Representative Poetry Online Web site, University of Toronto

Poetry
19th-century poetry